Mount Tujuh is a caldera volcano in the Barisan Mountains of Sumatra. It has seven (tujuh) peaks, of which only three have been climbed. Mount Tujuh has a large caldera lake at its centre, Lake Gunung Tujuh. It is located within Kerinci Seblat National Park.

The mountain supports one of only three known wild populations of the tropical pitcher plant Nepenthes aristolochioides.

See also

 List of volcanoes in Indonesia
 Geography of Indonesia

References

External links

Volcanoes of Sumatra
Mountains of Sumatra
Landforms of Jambi
Pleistocene calderas